Oberweis Dairy, headquartered in North Aurora, Illinois, is the parent company of several dairy-related and fast food restaurant operations in the midwest region of the United States. Its businesses include a home delivery service available in parts of Illinois, Indiana, Missouri, Michigan, North Carolina, Texas, and Wisconsin, which delivers traditional dairy products, including milk, ice cream, cheese, and yogurt, as well as bacon and seasonal products.

The businesses also include a chain of corporate-owned "Dairy and Ice Cream Stores", in the Chicago area, which sell many of the same products as the home delivery service, a distribution service which allows for some of their products (such as milk) to be available in regional supermarkets, and also includes a franchise service, which expanded the "Dairy and Ice Cream Stores" into Wisconsin, Indiana, Missouri, and Michigan after 2004.

In 2012, Oberweis also began a new franchise of high-end, fast food hamburger restaurants named "That Burger Joint". The firm is privately owned by the Oberweis family.

History 
The business was started in 1927 by Peter J. Oberweis, who made a profit by selling his excess milk to his neighbors in Kane County, Illinois. According to the Dairy's website, the family's farm was off of Molitor Road, in Aurora, Illinois. The family used a horse and carriage to deliver milk to their neighbors, beginning in 1927, after Peter J. Oberweis invested in half of the business of the Big Woods Dairy. The business continued in the family, with Peter's son, Joe, running the business through the 1950s. Current owner, Jim Oberweis, purchased the company from his brother in 1986 and named his son, Joe, CEO in 2007.

Home delivery 
In 1927, the company's founder began a home delivery service, which has continued since that time. Delivery has been in glass bottles, in the same way milk was delivered throughout the United States in the 1960s. A modern smartphone app supports tracking and timing deliveries.

Dairy and Ice Cream Stores 
In 1951, the Dairy and Ice Cream Stores began operation. The company currently has locations, both corporate-owned and franchised, throughout Chicago, its suburbs, northwest Indiana, around St. Louis, Missouri, near Indianapolis, Indiana, Milwaukee, Wisconsin, and near Detroit, Michigan. Some projects for the retail stores were done on a trial basis at the company's corporate office in North Aurora (which also includes a retail store) before being put into place at other locations, such as the stores' drive-through service, and the lunch/sandwich program, which began in 2004 and ended in July 2006. In 2012, Oberweis said that each dairy store generates between $1.25 million and $1.75 million per year.

That Burger Joint 
In 2012, Oberweis opened their first quick-service hamburger restaurant, named That Burger Joint, intended to expand as a chain and compete directly with Five Guys.

Woodgrain Neapolitan Pizzeria 
In 2017, Oberweis Dairy acquired Woodgrain Neapolitan Pizzeria, a pizzeria serving custom made personal pizzas in minutes.

Health stance 
Oberweis Dairy does not use or sell milk from cows treated with rBGH, recombinant Bovine Growth Hormone, despite United States Food and Drug Administration statements that the hormone does not have any detrimental effects on humans. Oberweis Dairy states their reason for the decision is to successfully fulfill their motto, which is to "Provide simply the best people, products, and places." Oberweis requires all of their dairy farmers to sign an annual agreement to refrain from using rBGH. Dairy cow diets contain corn and corn silage. Soy meal is used as a protein source. Haylage (chopped hay) and baled (dry) hay are also provided as feed. Vitamins and minerals are added to balance their diets. 90% of dairy herds graze when weather permits.

References

External links
 Official website

Dairy products companies of the United States
Drink companies of the United States
Privately held companies based in Illinois
Ice cream brands
Companies based in Kane County, Illinois
Fast-food chains of the United States
Ice cream parlors in the United States
1927 establishments in Illinois
American companies established in 1927
Food and drink companies established in 1927
Food and drink companies based in Illinois
Restaurant franchises